"Expander" is a 1994 song by British electronic music group The Future Sound of London, taken from their 1992 album, Accelerator. The single was released along with a remixed version and two other songs: "Moscow" and "Central Industrial". Accelerator was subsequently re-released in the US in 1996.

Track listing
 Expander (Radio Edit) (3:48)
 Expander (Remix) (4:53)
 Moscow (Remix) (4:55)
 Central Industrial (4:22)

Crew
Written, performed & produced by FSOL
Photography: FSOL Private Collection. Artwork design at Red Hot.

Charts

References

External links
 

The Future Sound of London songs
1994 singles
1992 songs